Woodsville is a census-designated place (CDP) and the largest village in the town of Haverhill in Grafton County, New Hampshire, United States, along the Connecticut River at the mouth of the Ammonoosuc River. The population was 1,431 at the 2020 census. Although North Haverhill is now the county seat of Grafton County, the village of Woodsville has traditionally been considered the county seat, as the county courthouse was originally located there. The county buildings are now located halfway between Woodsville and the village of North Haverhill to the south.

History

Woodsville was named for John L. Woods, a figure in its early development. He arrived from Wells River, Vermont, a village across the Connecticut River narrows in Newbury, and in 1829 purchased a sawmill which had been operating on the Ammonoosuc River since 1811. He manufactured pine lumber, and opened a store in his house. Spring snowmelt carried log drives down the Connecticut and Ammonoosuc rivers. A log boom was built across the Connecticut River to Wells River to hold the logs briefly for sorting. Logs not destined for Woods' mill were released gradually to avoid jams in the Ox Bow meadow downstream. Log drivers detailed to work at the boom enjoyed Woodsville's saloons and red-light district.

The Boston, Concord & Montreal Railroad opened at Woodsville in 1853 and built its division offices and a branch repair shop. It replaced the original 1805 bridge between the states with a two-level span, featuring a toll highway below and railroad tracks on the roof. The village boomed into an important railway town and junction, endowed with fine examples of Victorian architecture. It also became a center for legal affairs. The log drives were stopped after 1915, when pleasure boat owners complained about the hazards to navigation. In 1889, the Grafton County Court moved from Haverhill Corner to Woodsville, where it remained until moving halfway to North Haverhill in 1972.

Geography
Woodsville is in the northwest corner of the town of Haverhill, bordered to the north by the town of Bath and to the west by the Connecticut River, which forms the state border with Vermont. The Ammonoosuc River runs just north of the CDP and reaches its confluence with the Connecticut River at the northernmost point in the community.

Woodsville is crossed by U.S. Route 302 and by state routes 10 and 135. Route 10 leads south from Woodsville  to Hanover, and Route 135 leads north  to Interstate 93 northwest of Littleton.

Woodsville serves as the commercial center for the town of Haverhill and the surrounding communities, including several just to the west in Vermont. Many of the town's commercial businesses, including supermarkets, sit-down and fast-food restaurants, and banks, are located near the junction of US 302 and NH 10. Cottage Hospital, a critical-access hospital serving the area, is also located in Woodsville.

Demographics

As of the census of 2010, there were 1,126 people, 482 households, and 293 families residing in the CDP. There were 558 housing units, of which 76, or 13.6%, were vacant. The racial makeup of the CDP was 96.5% white, 0.2% African American, 0.5% Native American, 1.5% Asian, 0.1% Pacific Islander, 0.3% some other race, and 1.9% from two or more races. 1.2% of the population were Hispanic or Latino of any race.

Of the 482 households in the CDP, 30.7% had children under the age of 18 living with them, 41.1% were headed by married couples living together, 15.4% had a female householder with no husband present, and 39.2% were non-families. 31.7% of all households were made up of individuals, and 9.8% were someone living alone who was 65 years of age or older. The average household size was 2.34, and the average family size was 2.87.

23.9% of residents in the CDP were under the age of 18, 9.4% were from age 18 to 24, 26.3% were from 25 to 44, 28.1% ere from 45 to 64, and 12.3% were 65 years of age or older. The median age was 38.0 years. For every 100 females, there were 92.5 males. For every 100 females age 18 and over, there were 87.5 males.

For the period 2011–15, the estimated median annual income for a household was $40,708, and the median income for a family was $34,635. The per capita income for the CDP was $14,945. About 28.4% of the population and 20.3% of families were below the poverty line, including 40.1% of those under age 18.

Notable people 

 Ann Stone Minot (1894–1980), professor and research scientist at Vanderbilt University
 Chad Paronto, relief pitcher with the Baltimore Orioles, Cleveland Indians, Atlanta Braves, and Houston Astros
 Bob Smith, pitcher with the Boston Red Sox, St. Louis Cardinals, Pittsburgh Pirates, and Detroit Tigers
 Mark Steyn, columnist and author

In popular culture
In The Stand by Stephen King, Woodsville is mentioned as the home of Glen Pequod Bateman, a major character in the novel. He was an associate professor of sociology at the fictional Woodsville Community College when the superflu hit.

See also
 Disappearance of Maura Murray

References

External links
 Town of Haverhill website
 Woodsville Free Public Library

 
Census-designated places in Grafton County, New Hampshire
Census-designated places in New Hampshire
New Hampshire populated places on the Connecticut River
Haverhill, New Hampshire
Railway towns in New Hampshire